Mitsubishi Express is an automobile nameplate that has been used in Australia on three different models by the Japanese car manufacturer, Mitsubishi Motors:

Between 1980 and 1986, Mitsubishi in Australia sold the following vehicles:
 Mitsubishi L200 Express (MA/MB/MC/MD), a rebadged version of the Mitsubishi Forte.
 Mitsubishi L300 Express (SA/SB/SC/SD/SE), a rebadged version of the Mitsubishi Delica (second generation).

Between 1986 and 2013, Mitsubishi in Australia replaced the L300 Express with a new generation, now called Mitsubishi Express:
 Mitsubishi Express (SF/SG/SH/SJ), a rebadged version of the Mitsubishi Delica (third generation).

Between 1994 and 2005, Mitsubishi in Australia sold a separate, high end version of the Mitsubishi Express:
 Mitsubishi Express (WA), a rebadged version of the Mitsubishi Delica (fourth generation).

Between 2020 and 2022, Mitsubishi are selling a new generation of the Mitsubishi Express in Australia, with the name also being introduced to New Zealand:
 Mitsubishi Express (X82), a rebadged version of the Renault Trafic (third generation).

Express
Vehicles introduced in 1986
Rear-wheel-drive vehicles
Pickup trucks
Vans